Chen Haijian (born April 5, 1980 in Zhuhai, Guangdong) is a Chinese athlete specializing in the 100 metres. His personal best time is 10.17 seconds, achieved in Shanghai in September 2003.

Participating in the 2004 Summer Olympics, he achieved fifth place in his 100 metres heat, thus missing out on a placing in Round 2 of the event. His best international performances have been a gold medal at the 2003 Asian Championships and a bronze medal at the 2002 Asian Games.

His interests include music and computers.

Achievements

External links 
 
 
 
 
 

1980 births
Living people
Athletes (track and field) at the 2004 Summer Olympics
Chinese male sprinters
Olympic athletes of China
People from Zhuhai
Asian Games medalists in athletics (track and field)
Runners from Guangdong
Athletes (track and field) at the 2002 Asian Games
Asian Games bronze medalists for China
Medalists at the 2002 Asian Games